Criticism of Buddhism has taken numerous different forms, including philosophical and rational criticisms, but also criticism of praxis, such as that its practitioners act in ways contrary to Buddhist principles or that those principles systemically marginalize women. There are many sources of criticism, both ancient and modern, stemming from other religions, the non-religious, and other Buddhists.

Nihilism 

Friedrich Nietzsche, through Schopenhauer whose pessimism was highly influenced by Buddhist philosophy, interpreted Buddhism "as a life-negating philosophy that seeks to escape an existence dominated by suffering".

See also 
 Bulssi Japbyeon
 Index of Buddhism-related articles
 Secular Buddhism
 Sinhalese Buddhist nationalism
 Nichirenism
 Buddhism and violence

References

Further reading
 
 
 

 
Anti-Buddhism
Buddhism
Buddhism-related controversies
Buddhism and politics
Buddhist nationalism